The 1960 United States Senate election in Louisiana took place on November 8, 1960. Incumbent Democratic Senator Allen J. Ellender won re-election to a fifth term.

Primary elections
Primary elections were held on July 23, 1960.

Democratic primary

Candidates
Allen J. Ellender, incumbent U.S. Senator, unopposed

Results

Republican primary

Candidates
William Dane, former real estate salesman
George W. Reese Jr., attorney and Republican National Committeeman for Louisiana

Results
There were 8,588 registered voters in the Louisiana primary.

General election

Results

See also 
 1960 United States Senate elections

Notes

References

Bibliography
 

1960
Louisiana
United States Senate